Major-General Sir Charles Broke Vere  (21 February 1779 – 1 April 1843), né Broke, was a British soldier and Conservative Member of Parliament.

Life
He was the son of Philip Bowes Broke and the younger brother of Rear-Admiral Sir Philip Broke, 1st Baronet. After service during the Battle of Castricum,  Broke fought under the Duke of Wellington in the Napoleonic Wars and later rose to the rank of Major-General. For his gallantry at the Battle of Waterloo in 1815 he was awarded the Russian Order of St. Vladimir and the Dutch Order of Wilhelm. In 1822 he took the surname of Vere in addition to Broke. In 1825, upon Wellington's recommendation, he was appointed aide-de-camp to King William IV, a post he held for twelve years. He also represented East Suffolk in the House of Commons between 1835 and 1843. Broke Vere died in April 1843, at the age of 64.

References

External links 
 

1779 births
1843 deaths
British Army major generals
British Army personnel of the French Revolutionary Wars
British Army personnel of the Napoleonic Wars
UK MPs 1835–1837
UK MPs 1837–1841
UK MPs 1841–1847
Knights Commander of the Order of the Bath
Conservative Party (UK) MPs for English constituencies
Recipients of the Waterloo Medal
Recipients of the Order of St. Vladimir, 4th class